New Elizabethtown is an unincorporated community in Brownstown Township, Jackson County, Indiana.

History
New Elizabethtown was formerly called Elizabethtown. It was laid out in 1836.

Geography

References

Unincorporated communities in Jackson County, Indiana
Unincorporated communities in Indiana